Indotristicha is a genus of flowering plants belonging to the family Podostemaceae.

Its native range is India.

Species:

Indotristicha ramosissima 
Indotristicha tirunelveliana

References

Podostemaceae
Malpighiales genera